LRT Plius is a Lithuanian television station owned and operated by LRT. LRT Plius was launched on 16 February 2003 as 'LTV2', then changed its name to LRT Kultūra on 28 July 2012. Last iteration of this stations name was made on 1 October 2018 to LRT Plius.

History 
Channel was created in February 2003, at the start it was only shown in Vilnius and Kaunas. In 2005 the channel started to be broadcast in all Lithuanian territory. 2003-2007 broadcast všį „Kauno radijas ir televizija“ created TV shows about Kaunas city.

On 1 December 2009 analogue terrestrial broadcasting was discontinued.

Until 27 July 2012 the channel was called LTV2, also it was called "Lietuvos Televizijos: Antrasis Kanalas" (Lithuanian Television: Second Channel). On 27 July 2012, the channel was renamed as LRT Kultūra.

On 1 September 2017 HD broadcasts were started. On 1 October 2018 the channel was renamed as LRT Plius.

Seasons slogans 
 2003–2012: „Tavo kultūros kanalas“
 2017–2018: „Čia Lietuva. Čia LRT Kultūra“
 2018–2019: „Kultūra, kinas, sportas, dokumentika“

Logos and identities

References

External links

Television channels in Lithuania
Television channels and stations established in 2003
2003 establishments in Lithuania